Hitschler is a surname. Notable people with the surname include:

 Brigitte Hitschler (born 1954), German artist
  (1896–1945), German officer
 Thomas Hitschler (born 1982), German politician